Kazakhstan Karate-do Federation (Qazaqstan karate-do federatsııasy) is the national governing body (NGB) of karate for the National Olympic Committee of the Republic of Kazakhstan and as such is the official Member National Association (MNA) of the World Karate Federation (WKF) in Kazakhstan.

The organization has complete authority over all decisions regarding Kazakhstani national junior and senior team selections for World Karate Federation events. The tournaments that are held by the KKF are big and nationwide and many famous martial artists attend the events.

See also

External links

Karate organizations
Karate
Karate in Kazakhstan